Purser's Magazine was a computer magazine by Robert Elliott Purser and edited by Mary Ann Dobson.

Contents
Purser's Magazine was a magazine which consists of introductory-level articles on computers and reviews of software.

Reception
Bruce F. Webster reviewed Purser's Magazine in The Space Gamer No. 44. Webster commented that "I recommend this magazine with the following conditions: (1) you own a TRS-90 Model III or an Apple II; (2) you don't know much about computers; (3) you want descriptions of much of the currently popular software. Don't buy it expecting well-thought-out reviews."

References

External links

Game magazines